David Jonsson (born 1993/1994) is a British actor. He began his career on the West End. He is known for his roles in the BBC Two and HBO series Industry (2020–) and the film Rye Lane (2023).

In 2022, Jonsson appeared on the Evening Standard list of Londoners to watch and was one of British GQ's Men of the Year Honourees. He was named a 2023 Bright Young Thing by Tatler.

Early life
Jonsson grew up in Custom House, an area of the East London Docklands. His father was an IT engineer at Heathrow Airport, while his mother worked for the Metropolitan Police. He describes his background as Creole with African, Caribbean, and Swedish heritage.

After getting in trouble at school, Jonsson admitted to his mother that he wanted to be an actor. Once he completed his GCSEs, Jonsson spent two years in New York. Upon returning to London at the age of 18, he joined the National Youth Theatre and won a scholarship to study at the Royal Academy of Dramatic Art (RADA), graduating with a Bachelor of Arts in Acting in 2016.

Career
Upon graduating from RADA, Jonsson was cast in his professional stage debut as William Davison in the play Mary Stuart at the Almeida Theatre. The production transferred to Duke of York's Theatre in early 2017, marking Jonsson's West End debut. That same year, he appeared on the West End again, this time in Don Juan in Soho alongside David Tennant at Wyndham's Theatre.

In 2018, Jonsson made his television debut in two episodes of the ITV detective drama Endeavour. He wrote, directed, and starred in a short film titled Gen Y. The following year, he played the recurring character Isaac Turner in the second series of the Fox UK espionage thriller Deep State.

As of 2020, Jonsson stars as Augustus "Gus" Sackey in the BBC Two and HBO investment banking drama Industry. To prepare for the role, he visited the character's alma maters Eton College and Oxford University to familiarise himself with such a different background from his own. Jonsson won a 2021 Black British Theatre Award for his performance in and breathe... at the Almeida. He presented the Jean Michel Basquiat episode of Great Lives for BBC Radio 4.

Jonsson made his feature film debut opposite Vivian Oparah in the romantic comedy Rye Lane, which opened at the 2023 Sundance Film Festival to critical acclaim. He has upcoming roles in the films God's Spy and Benn/Eubank.

Filmography

Stage

Awards and nominations

References

External links
 
 David Jonsson at Spotlight

Living people
1990s births
Alumni of RADA
Black British male actors
English people of Swedish descent
Male actors from London
National Youth Theatre members
People from Canning Town